Omri Elmakyes (born 21 July 1987) is an Israeli football forward.

References

External links 
 

1987 births
Israeli Jews
Living people
Israeli footballers
Hapoel Nof HaGalil F.C. players
Hapoel Acre F.C. players
Ironi Tiberias F.C. players
Maccabi Ironi Kiryat Ata F.C. players
Hapoel Asi Gilboa F.C. players
F.C. Tzeirei Kafr Kanna players
Liga Leumit players
Israeli Premier League players
Israeli people of Moroccan-Jewish descent
Footballers from Northern District (Israel)
Association football forwards